The Second November is a 1983 Albanian historical drama film directed by Viktor Gjika. The film is based on the true events leading to the independence of Albania in 1912.

Cast

External links
 

1982 films
1980s historical drama films
Albanian historical drama films
Albanian-language films